Harold Marshall may refer to:
Harold Marshall (sniper) (1918–2013), Canadian World War II sergeant
Harold Marshall (acoustician) (born 1931), New Zealand educator, consultant and musician

See also
Harry Marshall (disambiguation)